Big Herk (born Amery Dennard on August 30, 1969) is an American rapper from Detroit, Michigan.

He started with the Detroit-based rap group Rock Bottom. He left in 2003 and released his debut Guilty As Charged. He was later featured in the movie Project 313. He is featured on Slum Village's Detroit Deli: A Taste of Detroit album featuring MC Breed titled It's On, and Obie Trice's Second Round's on Me album featuring Eminem and Trick-Trick title "There They Go". He was expected to release his first full-length album titled Over Dose in 2013.

Big Herk is a playable character in the video game Def Jam: Icon.

Discography

Albums
From The Bottom Up (1997)  (with Rock Bottom)
Alligator City (2000)  (with Rock Bottom)
Who Is Rock Bottom? (2002)  (with Rock Bottom)
Guilty As Charged (2003) 
Over Dose (2013)
The Bloodline (2016) (With Young Herk)

MixtapesStill Guilty: Da Undaground LP & DVD (2004)Got 'cha Back Ent. Presents... Play Time's Over (2007)''

Singles
 2003 "Gangsta's Only" Ft. J Nutty
 2003 "Ima Boss"
 2003 "M.O.T.O.W.N." Ft. K.D. & J-Nutty
 2004 "Living Da Life"
 2004 "Do What U Do"
 2007 "Playin' 4 Keeps" Ft. Solo & Devious
 2012 "Trap Goin' Ham"
 2013 "U Know Da Deal" ft. Young Herk
 2016 "D thang" ft. Young Herk

Appearances
2002 "Thugology" (Connected Ent. Vol. 1)
2002 "All I Know" featuring Fatal, Helluva, & Slimmie Hauffa
2003 "Murder City" by Cash Kola featuring MVP
2004 "It's On" by Slum Village featuring MC Breed.
2005 "Dead Beat Dad (Remix) 5150 featuring Bugz
2005 "Spot Life" 5150 featuring Rock Bottom
2005 "Rule #1" 5150 featuring Tuff Tone
2005 "Ride" by Royce Da 5'9" featuring Juan.
2005 "Everywhere We Go" by Tone & Peleboy
2006 "There They Go" by Obie Trice featuring Eminem & Trick Trick.
2006 "Detroit Stand Up (Remix)" by Esham featuring BO$$, Poe Whosaine, Malik, Al Nuke & Proof (rapper)
2008 "Temptation" by Lil Skeeter featuring Dwele.
2008 "Can't Hold Me Back" by Awesome Dre featuring Esham, Merciless Amir, Shaggy 2 Dope, & BO$$
2008 "Run With Us D-Boyz" by Johnny Saxx featuring Stretch Money & K Deezy
2009 "In The Hood" by Mann featuring Truth
2010 "Block Niggas" by Nefu Da Boss featuring Lady J
2012 "Don't Blow My High" by CityBoyWizzle & Foggs
2012 "They Dont Know" by CityBoyWizzle
2014 "Detroit Vs. Everybody" (remix) by Eminem, Big Sean, Royce da 5'9, Guilty Simpson, Boldy James, Trick-Trick, Dej Loaf, Danny Brown, and various other artists
2020 "Bag Money" by Mr. Way-Better

See also
Rock Bottom

References

External links
Official Big Herk Website
People's champion: Metro Times Article

1969 births
Living people
Rappers from Detroit
Underground rappers
21st-century American rappers
21st-century African-American musicians
20th-century African-American people